There are over 20,000 Grade II* listed buildings in England. This page is a list of these buildings in the district of Havant in Hampshire.

Havant

|}

Notes

External links

Lists of Grade II* listed buildings in Hampshire
Grade II* listed buildings in Hampshire by place